Calosima melanostriatella is a moth in the family Blastobasidae. It is found in the United States, including Connecticut, Maine, Ohio and Florida.

References

Moths described in 1910
melanostriatella